Sterling High School may refer to:

Sterling High School (Colorado) in Sterling, Colorado
Sterling High School (Illinois) in Sterling, Illinois
Sterling High School (Kansas) in Sterling, Kansas
Sterling High School (Nebraska) in Sterling, Nebraska
Sterling High School (New Jersey) in Somerdale, New Jersey
Sterling High School (Oklahoma) in Sterling, Oklahoma
Sterling High School (South Carolina) in Greenville, South Carolina
Sterling High School (Baytown, Texas) in Baytown, Texas
Sterling High School (Houston) in Houston, Texas

See also
Stirling High School